Maria Adelaide Mengas Matafome Ferreira (born 23 September 1959) is a Portuguese singer.

She started as a rock singer with the hit "Baby suicida" in 1981. After that, she has sung ballads. She represented Portugal in the Eurovision Song Contest 1985 with the song "Penso em ti (Eu sei)" which came 18th with 9 points.

She is also an actress on television having roles in many Portuguese soap operas.

Discography

Albums
Entre Um Coco e Um Adeus (Between a Coconut and a Goodbye) (LP, Polygram,1986)
Amantes Imortais/Fast And Far (2LP, MBP, 1989)
O Realizador está Louco (The Director is Crazy) (CD, Vidisco, 1996)
Só Baladas (Only ballads) (Compilação, BMG, 1998)
Sentidos (Senses) (CD, BMG, 2000) 
Outro Sol (Another Sun) (BB3, 2001)
O Olhar da Serpente (2002) "The Look of the Snake"
Adelaide Ferreira,(2004), Universal Music Portugal
Mais Forte que a Paixão, (2006), Farol (Stronger than the passion)
O Melhor de Adelaide Ferreira  (2008), (The best of Adelaide Ferreira), a compilation

Singles
Meu Amor Vamos Conversar os Dois (Single, Nova, 1978) (My love let's talk)
Espero por Ti/Alegria Em Flor (Single, Nova, 1980) (Wait For You/Joy in bloom)
Baby Suicida/A Tua Noite (Single, Vadeca, 1981) (Suicidal baby/Your night)
Bichos/Trânsito (Single, Vadeca, 1981) (Critters/Transit)
Não Não Não/Danada do Rock'n'Roll (Máxi, Polygram, 1983) (No No No/Damn Rock and Roll)
Quero-Te, Choro-te, Odeio-Te, Adoro-te (Single, Polygram, 1984) (I want you, Crying you, Hate you, Love you)
Penso em Ti, Eu Sei/Vem No Meu Sonho (Single, Polygram, 1985) (I think of you, I know/Comes in my dream)

References

External links

1959 births
Living people
Eurovision Song Contest entrants of 1985
Eurovision Song Contest entrants for Portugal
20th-century Portuguese women singers
21st-century Portuguese women singers